Ascalista is a small genus of sea snails in the family Columbellidae.

Species
There are two species in the genus Ascalista:
 Ascalista letourneuxi 
 Ascalista polita

References

Columbellidae
Genera